The 1963 All-Southwest Conference football team consists of American football players chosen by various organizations for All-Southwest Conference teams for the 1963 NCAA University Division football season.  The selectors for the 1963 season included the Associated Press (AP) and the United Press International (UPI).  Players selected as first-team players by both the AP and UPI are designated in bold.

All Southwest selections

Backs
 Don Trull, Baylor (AP-1; UPI-1 [QB])
 Tommy Ford, Texas (AP-1; UPI-1 [HB])
 Tommy Crutcher, Texas Christian (AP-1; UPI-1 [FB])
 Donny Anderson, Texas Tech (UPI-1 [HB])

Ends
 Dave Parks, Texas Tech (AP-1; UPI-1)
 Larry Elkins, Baylor (AP-1 [back]; UPI-1)
 Jerry Lamb, Arkansas (AP-1)

Tackles
 Scott Appleton, Texas (AP-1; UPI-1)
 Bobby Crenshaw, Baylor (AP-1; UPI-1)

Guards
 Tommy Nobis, Texas (UPI-1)
 John Hughes, SMU (UPI-1)
 Johnny Nichols, Rice (AP-1)
 Martin Cude, SMU (AP-1)

Centers
 Malcolm Walker, Rice (AP-1; UPI-1)

Key

See also
1963 College Football All-America Team

References

All-Southwest Conference
All-Southwest Conference football teams